Ratso may refer to:

 "Ratso" Rizzo, a main character in the film Midnight Cowboy and the novel on which it is based
 nickname of John Hiller (born 1943), Canadian former Major League Baseball relief pitcher
 nickname of Larry Sloman, American author best known for his collaboration with Howard Stern
 Ratso, a character on the 2000-2005 American animated TV show Jackie Chan Adventures
 Ratso, a character on the 1988-1989 anime Wowser
 Ratso the Rat, a character on the 1981 Saturday morning cartoon The Kwicky Koala Show
 Ratso, a character on the 1970-1971 American animated TV show Groovie Goolies
 Ratso, a character in The Brave Little Toaster to the Rescue and The Brave Little Toaster Goes to Mars

Lists of people by nickname